Art Linares (born October 31, 1987) is a former American politician who served as a Republican member of the Connecticut State Senate, representing the 33rd District from 2013 to 2018.

Political history

Linares was the State Senator for the 33rd Senate District, representing the Connecticut River Valley in the Connecticut Senate, including the towns of Chester, Clinton, Colchester, Deep River, East Haddam, East Hampton, Essex, Haddam, Lyme, Old Saybrook (part), Portland, and Westbrook.  He was the ranking Republican on the Planning and Development Committee.

After exploring a run for numerous statewide offices, Linares settled in January on the State Treasurer's race. Linares received support from many of his State Senate colleagues but failed to raise enough money to qualify for the Citizens' Election Program and ultimately could not assemble enough support from Connecticut Republicans to win at the Connecticut GOP convention. Linares was defeated by Salisbury investment executive Thad Gray. Linares's campaign message was built on his record as a proven winner of elections but he undercut his conservative credentials by voting against and then for DACA immigration bills in the Connecticut legislature. Linares supported Governor Dan Malloy's budget at a critical deadline. Linares was seen late in the switch round of voting pushing delegates and his staff hard for more votes, but reached a point of no return when the Fairfield delegation made Gray's lead insurmountable. Linares has asked for time to talk to his wife Caroline Simmons (D-Stamford) who is expecting the couple's first child, before deciding on whether to challenge Gray in the primary in August. Linares has decided to challenge Gray in the August primary but fired his campaign manager and is considering moving to the independent ballot before the August primary if he fails to pick up momentum quickly. Linares has stayed in the race but hired a Washington DC based campaign operative to manage his campaign.

Personal

Linares is the son of Art Linares Sr., a Cuban exile.  Linares earned his B.S. in entrepreneurship from the  University of Tampa.

Linares has aroused controversy by touting his experience running a small business on the campaign trail. Linares claims he cofounded and ran Greenskies, a solar energy company, but Linares was residing in Tampa, Florida during Greenskies early years in Connecticut and was never involved in the day-to-day management of the company. Greenskies was built and funded by Linares's father, Art Linares Sr. and Mike Silvestrini, the company's current president, although Linares does appear to have received some of the profit from the company's sale in 2017. Linares drives a Tesla. Robert Landino, CEO of former Centerplan Construction, who was fired from missing building deadlines of Dunkin' Donunts Park, was a primary investor.

Linares is married to a Democratic Mayor Caroline Simmons of Stamford. He proposed in a full page advertisement in the Stamford Advocate. Simmons and Linares cannot share a legal residence while they both remain in the state legislature, so Linares is giving up his seat in the State Senate to pursue statewide office.

See also

Connecticut Senate

References

External links

Republican Party Connecticut state senators
Living people
Place of birth missing (living people)
21st-century American politicians
People from Westbrook, Connecticut
American politicians of Puerto Rican descent
American politicians of Cuban descent
1987 births